Sir Denys Burton Buckley, MBE (6 February 1906 – 13 September 1998) was an English barrister and judge, rising to become a Lord Justice of Appeal.

Personal life

Denys Burton Buckley was born in Kensington, the son of Henry Burton Buckley, 1st Baron Wrenbury and Bertha Margaretta Jones.  He was educated at Eton College and Trinity College, Oxford.  He married Gwendolen Jane Armstrong-Jones (1905–1985), daughter of Sir Robert Armstrong-Jones and aunt of the Earl of Snowdon, on 23 July 1932.  They had three daughters.

During World War II, he served as a Major in the RAOC and GSO Directorate, Signals War Office, in respect of which he was awarded the US Medal of Freedom.

Career

He was called as a barrister Lincoln's Inn and practised from 11 Old Square, now Radcliffe Chambers. He was appointed as a Bencher in 1949, his arms were placed in the Hall in 1960, and he served as Treasurer in 1969.  He was appointed as a High Court Judge in 1960 in the Chancery Division, and received the customary knighthood. From 1962 to 1970 he served in the Restrictive Practices Court, and was appointed President in 1968.  In 1970 he was elevated to the Court of Appeal and was appointed a Privy Councillor.  He served as a member of the Law Reform Committee from 1963 to 1973.

Notable cases
 Stonegate Securities Ltd v Gregory [1980] Ch 576
 Mascall v Mascall
 Hart v O'Connor
 Hogg v Cramphorn Ltd
 Re Gray's Inn Construction Co Ltd
 Secretary of State for Employment v Associated Society of Locomotive Engineers and Firemen (No 2)
 Wallersteiner v Moir
 Borden (UK) Ltd v Scottish Timber Products Ltd

Death
He died on 13 September 1998, aged 92.

Arms

References

People educated at Eton College
Alumni of Trinity College, Oxford
Lords Justices of Appeal
Members of the Privy Council of the United Kingdom
Members of the Order of the British Empire
1906 births
1998 deaths
Knights Bachelor
Chancery Division judges
British Army personnel of World War II
Royal Army Ordnance Corps officers
Recipients of the Medal of Freedom
Younger sons of barons